Aphidius is a genus of insects of the family Braconidae.

The genus has a cosmopolitan distribution.

Adult Aphidius is a small wasp, usually less than 1/8 inch (3 mm) long. Aphidius wasps are endoparasitoids of aphids. The female wasp lays eggs in an aphid. When the eggs hatch, the wasp larvae feed on the inside of the aphid. As the larvae mature, the hosts die and become slightly enlarged or mummified, often becoming tan or yellow. Complete metamorphosis occurs within the host. The adult parasite chews the sugar out of the mummy leaving a hole.

The genus Aphidius includes many species that provide biological pest control of aphids on agricultural crops, greenhouses, urban landscape and home gardens.

Species
Aphidius adelocarinus Smith, 1944
Aphidius alius Muesebeck, 1958
Aphidius avenaphis Fitch
Aphidius colemani (Dalman, 1820)
Aphidius ervi (Haliday, 1834)
Aphidius linosiphonis Tomanovic & Starý, 2001
Aphidius nigripes Ashmead, 1901
Aphidius rhopalosiphi De Stefani Perez
Aphidius uzbekistanicus Luzhetzki

References

Braconidae
Braconidae genera
Taxa named by Christian Gottfried Daniel Nees von Esenbeck
Taxa described in 1818